Twin Valley High School can refer to:

 Twin Valley High School (Nebraska), Bartley, Nebraska
 Twin Valley High School (Pennsylvania), Elverson, Pennsylvania
 Twin Valley High School (Vermont), Wilmington, Vermont
 Twin Valley High School (Virginia), Pilgrim's Knob, Virginia